A government shutdown occurs when the legislative branch does not pass key bills which fund or authorize the operations of the executive branch, resulting in the cessation of some or all operations of a government. 

Government shutdowns in the United States have occurred periodically since 1980, and are the result of failure to pass appropriations bills before the previous ones expire. Shutdowns of the type experienced by the United States are nearly impossible in other forms of government. The most recent shutdown happened in December 2018.

 Under the parliamentary systems used in most European nations, stalemates within the government are less likely, but the executive must maintain the approval of the legislature to remain in power (confidence and supply), and typically an election is triggered if a budget fails to pass (loss of supply).
 In other presidential systems, the executive branch typically has the authority to keep the government functioning even without an approved budget.

United Kingdom
Until the passage of the Fixed-Term Parliaments Act in 2011, government shutdowns in the United Kingdom were impossible due to parliamentary convention. A government which could not command a majority in Parliament would be dismissed, either prior to the seating of Parliament when the Queen's Speech was voted down or later, when a vote of no confidence was tabled and passed, when a Finance Act was voted down, or when a major bill was voted down. 

The Fixed-term Parliaments Act, however, abolished these conventions, ensuring that the only way to call new elections was either for the explicit passage of a vote of no confidence or a two-thirds majority in the House of Commons calling for a new election. This led to speculation that a government shutdown could have been possible, with the government holding the House standing through tabled Votes of No Confidence but failing to pass legislation due to internal fighting or the breakdown of a coalition.

An American-style shutdown was also considered to be on the table in the context of Brexit, as some MP's proposed an amendment to "starve the government of cash" and create a "Donald Trump-style shutdown" in the event of a no-deal Brexit.

In 2022, the Fixed-term Parliaments Act was repealed by the Dissolution and Calling of Parliament Act, rendering virtually impossible the eventuality of a government shutdown.

Northern Ireland

In January 2017 the Assembly of Northern Ireland a power-sharing agreement collapsed, resulting in the national parliament being unable to pass bills, including critical spending bills. In December, this ongoing event almost resulted in an American-style shutdown, with regional civil services set to run out of money within days, but such a shutdown was averted when the British Government stepped in to keep local services funded.

United States

Government shutdowns, in United States politics, refer to a funding gap period that causes a full or partial shutdown of federal government operations and agencies. They are caused when there is a failure to pass a funding legislation to finance the government for its next fiscal year or a temporary funding measure. Ever since a 1980 interpretation of the 1884 Antideficiency Act, a “lapse of appropriation” due to a political impasse on proposed appropriation bills requires that the US federal government curtail agency activities and services, close down non-essential operations, furlough non-essential workers, and only retain essential employees in departments covering the safety of human life and/or protection of property. Voluntary services in these respective essential areas may only be accepted during emergencies.  Shutdowns are also possible at occurring within and disrupting state, territorial, and local levels of government.

Prior to 1980, funding gaps did not lead to government shutdowns, until Attorney General Benjamin Civiletti issued a legal opinion requiring  the government be shut down when a funding gap occurs. This opinion was not consistently adhered to through the 1980s, but since 1990 all funding gaps lasting longer than a few hours have led to a shutdown.

Some of the most significant shutdowns in U.S. history have included the 21-day shutdown of 1995–1996 during the Bill Clinton administration over opposition to major spending cuts; the 16-day shutdown in 2013 during the Barack Obama administration caused by a dispute over implementation of the Patient Protection and Affordable Care Act; and the 35-day shutdown of 2018-2019 during the Donald Trump administration, the longest shutdown in US history, caused by a dispute over the funding amount for an expansion of the U.S.–Mexico border barrier.

Shutdowns cause the disruption of government services and programs, including the closure of national parks and institutions (in particular, due to shortages of federal employees).  A major loss of government revenue comes from lost labor from furloughed employees who are still paid, as well as loss of fees that would have been paid during the shutdown.  Shutdowns also cause a significant reduction in economic growth (depending on the length of the shutdown). During the 2013 shutdown, Standard & Poor's, the financial ratings agency, stated on 16 October that the shutdown had "to date taken $24 billion out of the economy", and "shaved at least 0.6 percent off annualized fourth-quarter 2013 GDP growth".

See also 
 Budget crisis
 Cabinet crisis
 Constitutional crisis
 Gridlock (politics)
 Lockout (industry)

References 

Federal government of the United States
Government of the United Kingdom
Political crisis